Aspergillus deflectus is a species of fungus in the genus Aspergillus. It produces a group of antimicrobial chemical compounds known as deflectins. Aspergillus deflectus is in rare cases pathogenic. It is from the Usti section.

Growth and morphology

A. deflectus has been cultivated on both Czapek yeast extract agar (CYA) plates and Malt Extract Agar Oxoid (MEAOX) plates. The growth morphology of the colonies can be seen in the pictures below.

References

Further reading 
 
 
 

deflectus
Fungi described in 1955